Al-Quds Mosque Hamburg (Arabic: , meaning "Jerusalem", or Masjid Taiba ) was a mosque in Hamburg, Germany between 1993 and 2010 when it was shut down by German security officials. The mosque was known for preaching a radical form of Sunni Islam.  Al-Quds mosque was attended by some of the September 11 attackers including Mohamed Atta, Marwan al-Shehhi, Ramzi bin al-Shibh, and Ziad Jarrah who formed the Hamburg cell.

History
The mosque opened in 1993 and was run by the Taiba German-Arab Cultural Association.  It occupied a three-story building near the Hamburg Hauptbahnhof rail station in a red-light district, in the St. Georg section of Hamburg.  

Unlike many other mosques in Hamburg which cater to the Persian and Turkish populations, al-Quds served Hamburg's smaller Arab population.  Under the leadership of Iman Mohamed Fizazi (fr), the mosque preached a radical version of Sunni Islam.  Other leaders at the mosque have included Sheik Azid al Kirani.

The prayer room for men was located on the first floor and was able to accommodate up to 400. There was a separate prayer room for women, which was unpainted and uncarpeted.  On Fridays, the mosque usually had around 250 in attendance.

By 2004, the mosque had, according to security authorities, become a meeting points for North Africans and Iraqi proponents of jihadism. By 2009, the mosque had become a place where members of the Salafi movement traveled to meet.

2010 shut down
The mosque was shut down by German security officials in August 2010 amid suspicion that the mosque was again being used as a meeting place for Islamic extremists involved in the 2010 European terror plot.  German authorities discovered that ten members of the mosque had traveled to the border region of Pakistan and Afghanistan, and Shahab D., an Iranian at the mosque, had joined the Islamic Movement of Uzbekistan.

See also
 Islam in Germany
 List of mosques in Europe

References

External links

 

1993 establishments in Germany
2010 disestablishments in Germany
Mosques completed in 1993
Former mosques in Germany
Mosques in Hamburg
Buildings and structures in Hamburg-Mitte
Salafi mosques
Sunni Islam in Germany
Islamic terrorism in Germany
Hamburg cell